Kyerwa District is one of the eight districts of the Kagera Region of Tanzania. It is one of the 20 new districts that were formed in Tanzania since 2010; it was split off from Karagwe District.

The district is home to the Ibanda-Kyerwa National Park. The park is fed by the Kagera river that sustains animals such as hippos, leopards, antelope and buffalo.

Transport 

Unpaved trunk road T39 from Kayanga in Karagwe District to the Ugandan border passes through Kyerwa District from Omurushaka, Nkwenda, Isingiro, Kaisho to Murongo.
There is also unpaved road from Kayanga (administrative HQ for Karagwe district) via Rwambaizi, Katera, Businde, Bugomora, Nyamiyaga to Murongo.

Administrative subdivisions 

As of 2012, Kyerwa District was administratively divided into 18 wards.

Wards 

 Bugomora
 BUSINDE
 Isingiro
 Kaisho
 Kamuli
 Kibale
 Kibingo
 Kikukuru
 Kimuli
 Kyerwa
 Mabira
 Murongo
 Nkwenda
 Nyakatuntu
 Rukuraijo
 Rutunguru
 Rwabwere
 Songambele
Kitwechenkura

References 

Districts of Kagera Region